The SS Scharnhorst was a German passenger liner and mail ship launched in 1904. The ship was laid down at the Joh. C. Tecklenborg shipyard in Geestemünde, Germany, for the Norddeutscher Lloyd shipping company.

Scharnhorst belonged to a class of eleven steamers known as the Generals-class. Her sisterships were the steamships Zieten, Roon, Seydlitz, Gneisenau, Bülow, York, Kleist, Goeben, Lützow and Derfflinger, all built for the German Imperial Mail Service to Australia and the Far East. Occasionally these ships were run on the North Atlantic service of the Lloyd.

On 19 December 1908, Scharnhorst arrived in New York harbor, after having been delayed by inclement weather. Two passengers died on the trip, one killed by a wave that smashed him into the railing. Both passengers were buried the next day.

When the First World War started she had made 19 round trips to Australia, seven to the Far East and five to the USA. She was the only ship of her class to be in Germany in 1914 and was used for some time in 1917 and 1918 as a troop transport in the Baltic Sea.

1919 she was seized by France and used from 1921 to 1931 in French service as La Bourdonnais. In 1934 the ship was broken up in Genoa.

See also
 SS Scharnhorst (1934)

References

Literature
Edwin Drechsel: Norddeutscher Lloyd Bremen, 1857–1970; History, Fleet, Ship Mails, vol. 1. Vancouver: Cordillera, 1995

External links
SCHARNHORST (1904)/LA BOURDONNAIS [1921], at Palmer List of Merchant Vessels
Paquebot La Bourdonnais

Ships of Norddeutscher Lloyd
1904 ships